Beyond Brotherhood is a 2017 Panamanian drama film directed by Arianne Benedetti. It was selected as the Panamanian entry for the Best Foreign Language Film at the 90th Academy Awards, but it was not nominated.

Plot
A brother and sister, Joshua and Mia, are orphaned when their parents are killed in a domestic accident. Before she dies, their mother asks Joshua to promise always to take care of Mia, but the two of them are sent to separate orphanages. They escape, and grow up together on the streets. When they are adults, they discover that their parents' insurance company failed to contact them after the accident, and the money they receive enables them to open a restaurant. Mia also wins a scholarship to study psychology and falls in love with her professor, Chris Vianni. This creates tension between her and Joshua. Despite their differences, he steps in to protect her when he sees her being harassed by a man in a bar, and this sets into motion a tragic train of events.

Cast
 Drew Fuller as Chris Vianni
 Eric Roberts as Buelo Chino
 Valerie Domínguez as Mia Bedi
 Robin Duran as Joshua Bedi
 Maria Conchita Alonso as Puchy
 Juana Viale as Mama
 Arianne Benedetti as Mani Rombo

See also
 List of submissions to the 90th Academy Awards for Best Foreign Language Film
 List of Panamanian submissions for the Academy Award for Best Foreign Language Film

References

External links
 

2017 films
2017 drama films
Panamanian drama films
2010s Spanish-language films